The 2007–08 TFF First League (also known as Bank Asya First League due to sponsoring reasons) was the second-level football league of Turkey and the 45th season since its establishment in 1963–64. At the end of the season in which 18 teams competed in a single group, Kocaelispor and Antalyaspor, which finished the league in the first two places, and the play-off winner Eskişehirspor were promoted to the upper league, while Elazığspor, Istanbulspor and Mardinspor, which were in the last three places, were relegated.

Standings

Results

Promotion play-offs

Promotion play-offs will play in BJK İnönü Stadium in İstanbul. Semifinal matches will take place on May 16. League third is faced with league sixth and league fourth faced with league fifth. Winners of these matches will play on May 18 at final match. Winner of the match gained playing in Süper Lig in 2008-2009 season as Third of First League.

Top goalscorers

References 

 

TFF First League seasons
Turkey
1